Sidi Belahcen Mosque, also known as Sidi Bel Hasan Mosque or Sidi Abu al-Hasan Mosque is a historic mosque in the city of Tlemcen, Algeria. The mosque is located in the southwest of the square next to the Great Mosque of Tlemcen. Today it serves as a museum.

History
The mosque was founded in 1296 by the emir Abi Ibrahim ibn Yahya during the Zayyanid era as inscribed on the plank of the western wall in the prayer hall, as well as the two groves made of gypsum on top of the mihrab. The current name of the mosque is considered derived from the name of the local qadi and ulama Abi al-Hassan who served under the rule of the Sultan Abi Sayeed Uthman (1283-1303).

Architecture
The mosque has rather modest appearance compared to the other mosques of the same era. The mosque has no sahn and uses similar tiles for the floor and the qibla wall. The ceiling was consisted of interlocking logs made of cedar trees, which is the first of its kind in Algeria and predates three or four centuries the style employed in the Andalusian Moorish architecture.

Gallery

See also
  Lists of mosques 
  List of mosques in Africa
  List of mosques in Algeria

References

Bibliography
Bourouiba, R., L’art religieux musulman en Algérie, Alger : S.N.E.D., 1981, p. 108-129.
Bourouiba, A., Apports de l'Algérie à l'architecture arabo-islamique, Alger : S.N.E.D., 1986. Basset, H. ; Terrasse, H., « Sanctuaires et Forteresses almohades », in Hespéris, V, Paris : 1932.
Marçais, G., L'architecture musulmane d'Occident, Tunisie, Algérie, Maroc, Espagne et Sicile, Paris : Arts et métiers graphiques, 1954.
Marçais, G., Tlemcen, Paris : H. Laurens, « Les villes d'art célèbres », 1950.
Marçais, G., Les monuments arabes de Tlemcen, Paris : Fontemoing, 1905.

13th-century mosques
Mosques in Tlemcen
Zayyanid architecture